Gavmakhal-e Eyvani (also Romanized as Gāvmakhal-e Eyvānī; also known as Gāh Maghal, Gāmqāl, and Gāvmakhal) is a village in Howmeh Rural District, in the Central District of Gilan-e Gharb County, Kermanshah Province, Iran. At the 2006 census, its population was 203, in 54 families.

References 

Populated places in Gilan-e Gharb County